Jack O'Donnell may refer to:
 Jack O'Donnell (footballer) (1897–?), English professional football player
 Jack O'Donnell (rugby union) (c. 1877–c. 1956), rugby union player who represented Australia
 Jack O'Donnell (lobbyist), American lobbyist

See also
 John O'Donnell (disambiguation)